Crystal Peak, at , is a peak in the Raft River Mountains of Utah. The peak is located in Box Elder County and the area designated as Sawtooth National Forest, but the U.S. Forest Service does not own or manage the land on and around the peak. No roads or trails go to the summit.

The summit took its name from Crystal Spring.

References 

Mountains of Utah
Mountains of Box Elder County, Utah
Sawtooth National Forest